Qarwa Uqhu (Quechua qarwa pale, yellowish, golden, uqhu swamp, "yellowish swamp", hispanicized spelling Carhua Ojo) is a mountain in the Andes of Peru, about  high. It is located in the Ayacucho Region, Lucanas Province, Chipao District, southeast of Waytayuq.

References 

Mountains of Peru
Mountains of Ayacucho Region